The Central Manufacturing District–Original East Historic District (Original East Historic District) is a historic district listed on the National Register of Historic Places located in the Bridgeport and McKinley Park community areas. The Original East Historic District has sixty-six contributing properties and seven noncontributing properties. It does not include the entire area of the Central Manufacturing District with its contributing properties limited to the ranges of 3500-3700 blocks of South Morgan Street. South Racine Avenue, and South Iron Street: 3500-3900 blocks of South Ashland Avenue: 1000-1600 blocks of West 35th and West 37th Streets: and 1200-1600 West 38th Street.

References

Bridgeport, Chicago
McKinley Park, Chicago
Planned industrial developments
Commercial buildings on the National Register of Historic Places in Chicago
Historic districts on the National Register of Historic Places in Illinois
Historic districts in Chicago